The Merchants' National Bank of the City of New York was an American bank based in New York City.

History
On April 7, 1803, fourteen men met at 25 Wall Street to sign the Articles of Association, which were drawn up by former U.S. Secretary of the Treasury Alexander Hamilton, of the Merchants' Bank in the City of New York.

In 1803, a total of 24,925 shares, at $50 per share were owned by investors, totaling $1,246,250.  Elbert Adrian Brinckerhoff, son-in-law of W. R. Vermilye (former president of the New York Stock Exchange and brother of Merchants' Bank president Jacob D. Vermilye) was long associated with Merchants' Bank.

Pursuant to a merger agreement dated March 1, 1920 (and approved by the Superintendent of Banks on the same day), the Merchants' National Bank merged with the Bank of the Manhattan Company (the earliest of the predecessor institutions that eventually formed the current JPMorgan Chase & Co.), which was established in 1799 by Aaron Burr. The merger became effective on March 27, 1920.  Merchants' president, Raymond E. Jones, became vice president and second in command of the combined institutions.

The capital stock of the Merchants Bank at the time of its merger into The Manhattan Company was $3,000,000 consisting of 30,000 shares of the par value of $100 each all of which were listed upon the New York Stock Exchange.  On March 1, 1920, the Bank then known as The Merchants' National Bank of the City of New York, was converted from a national bank into a state bank under the name of The Merchants' Bank of the City of New York.

42 Wall Street
Since its establishment, the Bank occupied 42 Wall Street next door to the Manhattan Company (and its bank).  In 1839, they constructed a new building. That building was torn down and in 1883, foundation work began on a new building in the same location.  Construction of the Merchants' National Bank building was completed in 1885.  The building stood after the bank's 1920 merger until it was also demolished in 1929 to make way for the banks combined headquarter's at 40 Wall Street.

List of presidents of Merchants' National Bank
 Oliver Wolcott (1803–1804)
 Joshua Sands (1804–1808)
 Richard Varick (1808–1820)
 Lynde Catlin (1820–1833)
 John I. Palmer (1833–1858)
 Augustus Ely Silliman (1858–1868)
 Jacob Dyckman Vermilye (1868–1892)
 Robert M. Gallaway (1892–1917)
 Theodore E. Burton (1917–1919)
 Raymond E. Jones (1919–1920)

References

External links
The Merchants' National Bank of the City of New York: A History of its First Century (1903) by Philip Gengembre Hubert Jr.

1803 establishments in New York (state)
Banks established in 1803
Banks disestablished in 1920
Banks based in New York City
Defunct companies based in New York City
Defunct banks of the United States